The Colombian College of Archivists - CCA (Spanish: Colegio Colombiano de Archivistas)  is a private institution of social, scientific research, democratic, participatory and pluralistic character, which is based in the work, interdisciplinarity, participation and outreach and professional growth of its partners for the benefit of society.

The purpose of the College is to provide archivists an institution to defend the professional interests of the Collegial and the representation of practice, which also serves society by promoting the right to information through an assistance progressively of higher quality.

Mission
Leading scientific development and labor of the profession, and monitoring the performance of Collegial
Establish the National Register Single Archivists and certification of professional archivists nationals and foreign
Also, setting the pattern of ethics for professional performance in accordance with its own functions and assigned or determined by the existing legislation

Vision
Contributing to the growth of professional and personal archivist guiding their performance and vocation, based on humanistic principles and participate actively in the construction and permanent future of its members and society.

References

Archival science
Information schools
Professional associations based in Colombia